Events from the year 1908 in the United States.

Incumbents

Federal Government 
 President: Theodore Roosevelt (R-New York)
 Vice President: Charles W. Fairbanks (R-Indiana)
 Chief Justice: Melville Fuller (Illinois)
 Speaker of the House of Representatives: Joseph Gurney Cannon (R-Illinois)
 Congress: 60th

Events

January
 January 1
A ball signifying New Year's Day drops in New York City's Times Square for the first time.
Gustav Mahler makes his US conducting debut at the Metropolitan Opera.
Georgia introduces a law prohibiting alcohol.
 January 13 – A fire at the Rhoads Opera House in Boyertown, Pennsylvania, kills 170 people. The tragedy is a catalyst for stricter fire safety laws nationwide.
 January 15 – The Alpha Kappa Alpha sorority (the first Greek-letter organization for black college women) is established.
 January 21 – New York City passes the Sullivan Ordinance, making it illegal for people who control public places to allow women to smoke in them. It is vetoed by Mayor George B. McClellan Jr.

February
 February – The Converse Rubber Shoe Company (also known as the Boston Rubber Shoe Company) is formed in Malden, Massachusetts.
 February 12 
The first around-the-world car race, begins in New York City.
Division of Militia Affairs with the War Department.
 February 18 – Japanese immigration to the United States is restricted under the Gentlemen's Agreement of 1907.
 February 25 – The Bible Institute of Los Angeles (now Biola University) is founded.
 February 27 – A forty-sixth star is added to the United States flag representing the state of Oklahoma.

March
 March 4 – The Collinwood School Fire, near Cleveland, Ohio, kills 174 people.
 March 26 – The US Thomas Flyer car sails for Alaska at the head of a motor race from New York to Paris.

April
 April 8 – Harvard University votes to establish the Harvard Business School.
 April 14 – The first Hauser Dam in Montana fails, causing severe flooding and damage downstream.
 April 16 – Natural Bridges National Monument is established
 April 19 – The Garfield Park Conservatory in Chicago, designed by Jens Jensen, opens to the public for the first time.
 April 24 – The seventh deadliest tornado in U.S. history strikes the towns of Amite, Louisiana, Pine, Louisiana and Purvis, Mississippi, killing 143 and injuring 770.

May
 May 10 – Mother's Day is observed for the first time, at Andrew's Methodist Church in Grafton, West Virginia.

June
 June 20 – The Georgia Tech Alumni Association is chartered in Atlanta, Georgia.

July
 July 1 – Carson National Forest is established.
 July 22 – The automobile manufacturing company Fisher Body is founded.
 July 25 – John Baxter Taylor, graduate of the University of Pennsylvania, becomes the first African American to win an Olympic Gold Medal (in the men's 400-metre relay) at the London Summer Olympics
 July 26 – Attorney General Charles Joseph Bonaparte issues an order to immediately staff the Office of the Chief Examiner (later renamed the Federal Bureau of Investigation).

August
 August 14 – Springfield Race Riot of 1908 in Springfield, Illinois.
 August 31 – A charter is granted for Wayland Literary and Technical Institute in Plainview, Texas (now Wayland Baptist University).

September
 September 16 – William C. Durant founds the company which eventually becomes General Motors.
 September 17 – At Ft. Myer, Virginia, U.S.A. Thomas Selfridge becomes the first person to die in an airplane crash. The pilot, Orville Wright, is severely injured in the crash, but makes a recovery.

October

 October 1
 Official launch of Henry Ford's Ford Model T automobile, the first having left the Ford Piquette Avenue Plant in Detroit, Michigan, on September 27. The initial price is set at $850.
 Penny Post is established between the United Kingdom and United States.
 October 10 – First section of Long Island Motor Parkway opened.
 October 13 – The Church of the Nazarene is organized officially at Pilot Point, Texas as the Pentecostal Church of the Nazarene. This is the official "birthday" of the denomination.
 October 14 – The Chicago Cubs win the 1908 World Series defeating the Detroit Tigers in Game 5. They would not win again until November 2, 2016, which stands as the longest championship drought in sports history.
 October 15 – The Metz Fire in Metz Township, Michigan; 37 people are killed, 134 families—about 700 people— are made homeless.

November
 November 3 – 1908 Presidential election: Republican William Howard Taft defeats Democrat William Jennings Bryan.
 November 24 – The first credit union in the United States begins operation in Manchester, New Hampshire.

Undated
 The Western University of Pennsylvania is renamed the University of Pittsburgh.
 The State Normal and Industrial School for Women, precursor to James Madison University, is founded in Harrisonburg, Virginia.
 The University of Omaha, precursor of the University of Nebraska Omaha is founded as a private non-sectarian college.
 Benjamin Franklin Institute of Technology in Boston, Massachusetts, is established under the terms of Franklin's will.
 The American Temperance University closes.
 The first upright vacuum cleaner is invented by James Murray Spangler and the rights sold later in the year to The Hoover Company.

Ongoing
 Progressive Era (1890s–1920s)
 Lochner era (c. 1897–c. 1937)
 Black Patch Tobacco Wars (1904–1909)
 Great White Fleet voyage (1907–1909)

Births

January – March
 January 1 – Bill Tapia, musician (died 2011)
 January 11 – Lionel Stander, actor (died 1994)  
 January 14 – Russ Columbo, singer, bandleader, and composer (died 1934)
 January 17 – Cus D'Amato, boxing trainer (died 1985)  
 January 27 – Oran "Hot Lips" Page, Jazz musician (died 1954)
 February 2 – Justice M. Chambers, Medal of Honor recipient (died 1982)
 February 10 – Charles Henri Ford, novelist, poet, filmmaker, photographer and collage artist (died 2002)
 February 17 – Red Barber, Baseball announcer and sports journalist (died 1992)
 February 25 – George Duning, film composer (died 2000)  
 February 26 – Tex Avery, Cartoonist (died 1980)
 February 29 – Dee Brown, writer and historian (died 2002)
 March 4 – T.R.M. Howard, African-American civil rights leader and surgeon (died 1976)
 March 5  –  Irving Fiske, American playwright, WPA writer and speaker; co-created Quarry Hill Creative Center in Rochester, Vermont, early children's rights activist; died 1990)
 March 13 – Walter Annenberg, Publisher and philanthropist (died 2002) 
 March 20 
 Kermit Murdock, actor (died 1981)  
 Frank Stanton, businessman (died 2006)
 March 22 – Louis L'Amour, author (died 1988)
 March 26 – Henry (Hank) Sylvern, Radio personality (died 1964)
 March 29 – Arthur O'Connell, Actor (died 1981)

April – June
 April 1 – Abraham Maslow, psychologist (died 1970)
 April 2 – Buddy Ebsen, actor and dancer (died 2003)
 April 4 
 Ernestine Gilbreth Carey, author (died 2006)
 Frances Ford Seymour, socialite (died 1950)
 April 5 – Bette Davis, actress (died 1989)
 April 6 – John P. Davies, diplomat (died 1999)
 April 15 – eden ahbez, musician (died 1995)
 April 20 – Lionel Hampton, African-American musician and bandleader (died 2002)
 April 25 – Edward R. Murrow, Journalist (died 1965)
 April 29 – Jack Williamson, science fiction author (died 2006)
 May 3 – Howard Cary, American engineer & founder of Cary Instruments (died 1991)
 May 10 – Helen Elsie Austin, American attorney (died 2004)  
 May 20 – James Stewart, actor (died 1997)
 May 23 
 Max Abramovitz, architect (died 2004) 
 John Bardeen, physicist, Nobel Prize laureate (died 1991)
 May 25 – Theodore Roethke, poet (died 1963)
 May 30 – Mel Blanc, voice actor (died 1989)
 May 31 – Don Ameche, actor (died 1993)
 June 13 – Marjorie F. Lambert, archaeologist & anthropologist (died 2006) 
 June 18 – Bud Collyer, voice actor and game show host (died 1969)
 June 20 – Billy Werber, baseball player (died 2009)
 June 21
 William Frankena, moral philosopher (died 1994) 
 Marjorie Gladman, tennis player (died 1999) 
 June 23 – Karl Warner, athlete (died 1995)  
 June 25 
 Joe Becker, baseball player (died 1998)  
 Willard Van Orman Quine, philosopher (died 2000)
 June 26 – William F. Knowland, United States Senator from California from 1945 till 1959. Politician and newspaperman (died 1974)
 June 27 
 Bill Kennedy, actor (died 1997)
 Charles Stevenson, philosopher (died 1979)  
 June 29 
 Leroy Anderson, composer (died 1975)
 Sally Haley, painter (died 2007)  
 June 30 – Eunice Norton, pianist (died 2005)

July – September
 July 1 – Alvino Rey, swing era musician and bandleader (died 2004)
 July 3 – M. F. K. Fisher, food writer (died 1992)
 July 5
 Lyman S. Ayres II, businessman (died 1996)  
 Don Dunphy, television and radio sports announcer (died 1998)  
 July 8 – Nelson A. Rockefeller, 49th Governor of New York from 1959 to 1973 and 41st Vice President of the United States from 1974 to 1977 (died 1979)
 July 12 – Milton Berle, comedian (died 2002)
 July 19 – Daniel Fry, contactee (died 1992) 
 July 21 
 William E. Jenner, U.S. Senator from Indiana from 1947 to 1959 (died 1985)
 Jug McSpaden, professional golfer (died 1996)  
 Magruder Tuttle, rear admiral, football player (died 1998)  
 July 22 – Claire Falkenstein, sculptor, painter, printmaker, jewelry designer and teacher (died 1997)
 July 23
Karl Swenson, actor (died 1978)
James C. Tison, Jr., admiral and civil engineer (died 1991) 
 July 25 – Kathryn Eames, actress (died 2004)
 July 27 – Joseph Mitchell, writer (died 1996)
 August 2 – Al Alquist, California politician (died 2006)
 August 9 – A. I. Bezzerides, screenwriter (died 2007)
 August 16 
 Orlando Cole, classical cellist and educator (died 2010)
 William Maxwell, novelist and editor (died 2000)** Miriam Rosen Minsker, centenarian (died 2017)
 August 20 – Al López, baseball player and manager (died 2005)
 August 21 –  Tom Tully, actor (died 1982)
 August 27 – Lyndon B. Johnson, 36th President of the United States from 1963 to 1969, 37th Vice President of the United States from 1961 to 1963 (died 1973)
 August 28 – Roger Tory Peterson, naturalist, artist and educator (died 1996)
 August 30 – Fred MacMurray, actor (died 1991)
 August 31 – William Saroyan, fiction writer (died 1981)
 September 2 – Ruth Bancroft, landscape and garden designer (died 2017) 
 September 4 – Richard Wright, African-American author (died 1960)
 September 6 – Korczak Ziolkowski, sculptor (died 1982)
 September 7 
 Paul Brown, football coach (died 1991)
 Michael E. DeBakey, surgeon and medical researcher (died 2008)
 September 10 – Raymond Scott, composer, bandleader, electronic music pioneer (died 1994)
 September 13 – Mae Questel, actress (died 1998)
 September 15 – Penny Singleton, actress (died 2003) 
 September 16 – Neil Reagan, radio station manager, and CBS senior producer (died 1996) 
 September 29 – Eddie Tolan, athlete (died 1967)

October – December
 October 6 – Carole Lombard, film actress (died 1942)
 October 9 – Lee Wiley, jazz singer (died 1975)
 October 14 – Ruth Hale, playwright and actress (died 2003)
 October 20 
 Geraldine Branch, gynecologist (died 2016) 
 Carl Stuart Hamblen, musician and presidential candidate (died 1989)
 October 22 – John Gould, humorist, essayist and columnist (died 2003)
 October 25 – Polly Ann Young, actress (died 1997) 
 October 27 – Lee Krasner, American painter (died 1984)
 November 1 – Felix Knight, actor, tenor, and vocal coach (Babes in Toyland (1934)) (died 1998)  
 November 12 – Harry Blackmun, judge (died 1999)
 November 14 – Joseph McCarthy, U.S. Senator from Wisconsin (died 1957)
 November 18 – Imogene Coca, actress (died 2001)
 November 20 – Alistair Cooke, English-born journalist (died 2004)
 November 23 – Nelson S. Bond, science fiction writer (died 2006)
 November 28 – Mary Oppen, activist, artist, photographer and writer (died 1990)
 November 29 – Adam Clayton Powell, Jr., politician (died 1972)
 December 3 – Edward Underdown, actor (died 1989)
 December 4 – Alfred Hershey, bacteriologist, Nobel Prize laureate (died 1997)
 December 6 – Baby Face Nelson, bank robber (died 1934)
 December 7 – Slim Bryant, country music singer, songwriter and guitarist (died 2010)
 December 11 – Elliott Carter, composer (died 2012)
 December 14 – Morey Amsterdam, actor and comedian (died 1996)  
 December 16 – Frances Day, actress and singer (died 1984)
 December 17 – Willard Libby, chemist, Nobel Prize laureate (died 1980)
 December 21 – Herbert Hutner, banker and lawyer (died 2008)
 December 23 – Sol Carter, baseball player (died 2006)

Deaths
 February 1 – Sara Iredell Fleetwood, African-American nurse and teacher (born 1849)
 February 21 – Harriet Hosmer, neoclassical sculptor, first female professional sculptor (born 1830)
 March 25 – Durham Stevens, diplomat (born 1851)
 March 26 – Louis Chauvin, ragtime pianist (born 1881)
 March 27 – Charles N. Sims, Methodist preacher, third chancellor of Syracuse University (born 1835)
 April 19 – Simon B. Conover, U.S. Senator from Florida from 1873 to 1879 (born 1840)
 April 20 – Henry Chadwick, English-born baseball writer and historian (born 1824)
 May 14 – John O'Connell, baseball player (born 1872)
 June 1 – James Kimbrough Jones, U.S. Senator from Arkansas from 1885 to 1903 (born 1839)
 June 9 – Drusilla Wilson, American temperance leader and Quaker pastor (born 1815)
 June 13 – Henry Lomb, German-American optician, co-founder of Bausch & Lomb (born 1848)
 June 14 – Frederick Stanley, 16th Earl of Derby, founder of the Stanley Cup (born 1841)
 June 24 – Grover Cleveland, 22nd and 24th President of the United States from 1885 to 1889 and from 1893 to 1897 (born 1837)
 July 3 – Joel Chandler Harris, author (born 1848)
 July 10 – Phoebe Knapp, hymn composer (born 1839)
 July 29 – Estelle M. H. Merrill, journalist (born 1858)
 August 4 – William B. Allison, U.S. Senator from Iowa from 1873 to 1908 (born 1829)
 August 26 – Tony Pastor, vaudeville and theater impresario (born 1837)
 September 17 – Thomas Selfridge, army officer & first aviation casualty (born 1882)
 October 30 – Caroline Astor, socialite (born 1830)
 November 7 – Butch Cassidy, train and bank robber (born 1866)
 December 9 – William Harvey Carney, first African American to receive the Medal of Honor (born 1840)
 December 13 – Augustus Le Plongeon, photographer and antiquarian (born 1826)
 Jacob W. Davis, Latvian-born tailor, inventor of jeans (born 1831)

See also
 List of American films of 1908
 Timeline of United States history (1900–1929)

References

External links
 

 
1900s in the United States
United States
United States
Years of the 20th century in the United States